The Anglican Church of St Peter and St Paul at Runnington in Langford Budville, Somerset, England was built in the 15th century. It is a Grade II* listed building.

History

The nave and tower of the church were built in the 15th century. Around 1840 the chancel was rebuilt and a new roof installed.

The rood screen was removed when the organ was installed.

The parish is part of the Wellington and district benefice within the Diocese of Bath and Wells.

Architecture

The red sandstone building has Hamstone dressing and a tiled roof. The three-stage tower, which was built in 1509, is supported by diagonal buttresses. There are five bells.

See also  
 List of ecclesiastical parishes in the Diocese of Bath and Wells

References

Grade II* listed buildings in Taunton Deane
Grade II* listed churches in Somerset